Dichomeris baxa is a moth in the family Gelechiidae. It was described by Ronald W. Hodges in 1986. It is found in North America, where it has been recorded from California.

Adults have been recorded on wing from April to July and again in October.

The larvae feed on Corethrogyne californica and Corethrogyne filaginifolia.

References

Moths described in 1986
baxa